is a Japanese light novel series by Takaya Kagami, with illustrations by Japanese-Brazilian illustrator Yū Kamiya. The series includes 13 novels published by Fujimi Shobo between November 2008 and December 2013. The series also has a spin-off series, which has five volumes since February 2010. A manga adaptation by Shiori Asahina started serialization in the shōnen manga magazine Monthly Dragon Age on October 9, 2009. A 12-episode anime adaptation aired between July and September 2011.

Plot
Kurogane Taito is a freshman in Miyasaka High. Ever since an injury to his leg (a snapped tendon) that prevented him from practicing karate, which he had excelled in since elementary school, he has always believed that he was an ordinary, regular guy. However, due to a promise exchanged with a beautiful Vampire (Most Ancient Sorcerer) Saitohimea nine years ago which he has forgotten about, he is in fact no longer ordinary. Nine years ago, Saitohimea injected him with a poison, which prevents him from dying as long as he doesn't die seven times within fifteen minutes. Shortly after his change, a boy named Kurenai Hinata attacked them with a demon and killed Taito six times in rapid succession. In order to prevent him from killing Taito outright, Saitohimea agreed to leave with Hinata and allow Taito's memory to be wiped. Subsequent to this, Saitohimea was experimented on and imprisoned in a dimension with no sound or light whatsoever, and Taito continued with his life as a normal human.

Taito has recently been having a recurring dream concerning Saitohimea, although he is unable to remember her name. After saving Andou Mirai from being hit by a truck he is himself killed, however due to his conditional immortality, he survives. After his body picks up and reattaches his head, he begins to remember more details about Saitohimea and eventually recalls her name, which allows Saitohimea to regain her powers and escape from her prison. By this point, Taito has realized that not only are his most recent injuries healed, but his previous leg injury is also healed. He is attacked by the Church but is able to survive and he makes his way to the playground where he and Saitohimea met previously, where they are reunited.

Along with unlikely allies, Kurenai Gekkou, Miyasaka High's student council president and genius who is bent on avenging his parents as well as Andou Mirai, Gekkou's cute lightning demon familiar, Taito and Saitohimea have to contend against Gekkou's younger twin brother, Kurenai Hinata, who seeks to resurrect the powerful Vampire (Most Ancient Sorcerer) Bahlskra. Unknown to them, their destinies were already woven and foretold in an ancient prophecy of epic proportions.

Characters

A light-blue hair 16-year-old freshman of Miyasaka High, the protagonist of the story, Kurogane Taito used to excel in karate when he was young, but later had to give it up due to a leg injury. Since then, he had believed himself to be an ordinary, regular guy. However, his memories of an event nine years ago were sealed up, during which he had made a contract with the beautiful Saitohimea and acquired an extraordinary ability which grants him a conditional form of immortality. At the start of the story, he manages to regain those memories after a certain incident and goes on to reunite with Saitohimea. He later acquires further powers and swears to protect Saitohimea from the Tenma (天魔). One of the powers he acquires is a familiar in the form of a cat, this familiar, called Nyankichi, required a certain amount of blood to be summoned which was impossible for a normal human to give without dying. The familiar enabled him to cast spells which allowed him to see in the dark as well as a magic which curses other magic, therefore sealing them. While Tenma is normally translated as evil spirit or demon, in the story, it is a special existence different from the conventional evil spirit. He gradually remembers the feelings he had for Saitohimea and realizes he is falling in love with her as she is with him.

 / 

Excluding the sealed up Bahlskra, Saitohimea is the last of the Vampires. In the story, 'Vampire' is used as the furigana reading of 'Most Ancient Sorcerer' (最古の魔術師). Saitohimea is described to have mischievous crimson eyes, pink lips, and lavender colored hair which ends in a spectrum of colors. Since she was born, everyone around her has sought and hunted her for her powers, except for Taito, whom she fell in love with and subsequently formed a contract with. In order to revive the dead Taito, she exchanged most of her powers in order to revive him, but still retains a large amount compared to humans. She later joins Miyasaka High as a student, and together with Taito, becomes part of Gekkou's student council and takes on the name of Himea Saito.

Kurenai Gekkou, a freshman and also the student council president of Miyasaka High, is a self-proclaimed genius. Nine years ago before the starting tumeframe of the story, due to a certain deed committed by his younger twin brother, Hinata, Gekkou was prompted to constantly seek out power, initially driven by the fear for his life, and later motivated by the prospects of revenge. Gekkou is demonstrated to be quick-witted and highly intelligent. He wields an ancient fencing-like sword known as Spell Error, and is trained in several traditional arts of exorcism. As the student council president, he has made a contract with the lightning demon Mirai and is tasked to be the guardian of the Holy Ground (聖地)( a location with certain special properties over which Miyasaka High was built). He claims Mirai as his property and is very possessive over her. His superiority complex is often shown by his self proclamation of Genius, and belief that he is stronger than his brother.

Also a student of Miyasaka High despite her age, Mirai is a lightning demon that takes on the form of a cute, 14-year-old bishōjo. Initially tasked to kill Gekkou, she later went on to form a contract with him as she became unable to release her powers without his consent. While she is considered to be an upper-class demon of noble blood, most of her powers are usually sealed away by Gekkou and can only be re-activated with his permission, upon which her hair will turn golden and her body will be wrapped in a vortex of lightning. She is described to be excessively boisterous and annoying to Gekkou, though on the flip side, she is often irritated by Gekkou's apparent indifference to her existence. Her favorite pastime is reading manga and drawing, whilst her favourite drink is Dr. Cinnamon.

A girl with medium length hair, Haruka is the classmate and childhood friend of Taito. She carries romantic feelings for Taito. Her role is revealed to be of an observer later in the story, though she only knows this when her other personality is in control. Her other personality lacks emotion compared to her counterpart and is aware of the events around her.

Younger identical twin brother of Gekkou. Described to be cold and emotionless, he sees all other humans, including his own brother, as inferior to himself. He wields several powers, including the ability to summon different contracted demons and dimensional beings to do his bidding. Hinata wants to capture Saitohimea for a particular reason.

A powerful sealed up Vampire (Most Ancient Sorcerer) at the start of the story. He has deep ties to Saitohimea. It is later revealed that Bahlskra is an alternate personality. Saitohimea created him to fend off her loneliness, and by defeating Bahlskra was the first part of a certain magic called Bliss completed.

A delinquent of Miyasaka High. Due to the fact that her memory of a demon attack in school was not erased, she decided to become the secretary of Gekkou's student council, much to his discontent. She has a friendly rivalry with Gekkou.

A powerful half-elf spell breaker from the world of elves. His power is oriented towards seals and barrier construction. Serge has golden hair and deep blue eyes and possesses a friendly disposition. The desire to save their mother from the wounds and damages incurred from the Church's experiments prompted him and Hasga to join Gekkou's student council in the human world, after they have helped rescue their mother, Ela of the East. He was influenced by Taito, causing him to seal his mother rather than destroy her, against his original intentions and her pleas.

A powerful half-elf spell breaker from the world of elves. His power is oriented towards destruction which also includes seals and barriers and magic. The younger brother of Serge, Hasga has deep blue hair and golden eyes and possesses a temperament disposition. The desire to save their mother from the wounds and damages incurred from the Church's experiments prompted him and Serge to join Gekkou's student council in the human world, after they have helped rescue their mother, Ela of the East.

A young German girl of the Temperon Crowely group. She has silver hair tied up into twin tails, and is skilled in the Japanese sword and flame magic. She appears to have some ties to Gekkou.

7th student council president of Miyasaka High who is currently an agent of the Military. Usually dressed in a suit with a red tie and wears gloves. He is a formidable opponent who is sent to supervise, build up the current student council, and keep them in check. It was due to him that Izumi was allowed to remain in the Student Council without erasing her memory. His ability is strong enough to counter the weakened Saitohimea. He appears to have some ulterior motive.

Familiar of Taito from another dimension. Taito got to him through a fragment of the fountain of knowledge acquired from Edeluka. In exchange for Taito's blood daily, he grants Taito two powers: Night vision and spell displacement.

Powerful female elf who is the mother of Serge and Hasga. She was betrayed by her kin to the Church and experimented on.

From the demon plane (Makuae), Skrald is the descendant of Indra and the mother of Mirai. She belongs to the most powerful class of demons in Makuae.

Liiru is the personified spirit of the Holy Ground of Miyasaka High, which unlike other Holy Grounds, is a unique Holy Ground where all dimensions and worlds intersect. She appears as a 12-year-old fair-skinned girl with black hair and wearing a dark kimono. Liir cannot see people who are above eighteen years old. Her current contractor is the 12th student council president, Kurenai Gekkou.

Media

Light novels
The light novels were written by Takaya Kagami, with illustrations by Brazilian illustrator Yū Kamiya. Fujimi Shobo published 13 volumes under their Fujimi Fantasia Bunko imprint between November 25, 2008 and December 25, 2013. The ninth volume, released in December 2011, came bundled with an original video animation episode written by Takaya Kagami. The episode consist of three short stories, two based on ideas tweeted in by fans, and one as a crossover with another of Kagami's work, The Legend of the Legendary Heroes.

Manga
The manga adaptation, illustrated by Shiori Asahina, was published in Monthly Dragon Age from October 9, 2009 to July 9, 2012 and collected into six volumes.

Anime

References

External links
 

2008 Japanese novels
2009 manga
2010 Japanese novels
2011 Japanese television series debuts
2011 Japanese television series endings
Anime and manga based on light novels
Fujimi Fantasia Bunko
Fujimi Shobo manga
Magical girl anime and manga
Kadokawa Dwango franchises
Light novels
Shōnen manga
Zexcs